J. Harrop (dates of birth and death unknown) was an English cricketer. Harrop's batting and bowling styles are also unknown. He was educated at Bramham College. He played club cricket for Broughton, Manchester from 1864 to 1878 and Manchester Clifford in 1884.

Harrop made a single first-class appearance for Lancashire against Derbyshire at Old Trafford in 1874. Derbyshire won the toss and elected to bat first, being dismissed for 190, with Harrop bowling seven wicketless overs. Lancashire were dismissed for just 38 in their first-innings, with Harrop last man out, dismissed for a duck by Joseph Flint. Forced to follow-on in their second-innings, Lancashire made 181 all out, with Harrop again last man out, dismissed for 5 runs by Thomas Attenborough. Derbyshire chased their second-innings target successfully with nine wickets in hand. This was his only major appearance for Lancashire.

References

External links
J. Harrop at ESPNcricinfo
J. Harrop at CricketArchive

English cricketers
Lancashire cricketers